Akhil Maheshwari is a neonatologist. He has developed the Global Newborn Society, a worldwide organization that aims to promote international scientific and social efforts focused on newborn health.

Education 
Maheshwari received medical education at Banaras Hindu University, Varanasi and the Postgraduate Institute of Medical Education and Research, Chandigarh in India, and then relocated to the University of Florida at Gainesville, Florida for further training in clinical pediatrics and laboratory research. Two years later, he relocated with the same team to the University of South Florida Morsani College of Medicine, Tampa, Florida, to receive fellowship training in neonatology and to continue his medical research.

Faculty positions and Work in Public Health 
In 2004, Maheshwari joined the University of Alabama at Birmingham, Alabama as an assistant professor. He studied innate immunity and the pathogenesis of gut mucosal and systemic inflammation in newborn infants, with a particular focus on a disease called necrotizing enterocolitis (NEC). In this disease, the intestines of a premature or critically-ill infant become inflamed and lose viability. His research was supported by the American Gastroenterological Association and the National Institutes of Health.

In 2010, he moved to the University of Illinois College of Medicine at Chicago, Illinois as the Head of Neonatology.

In 2014, he was recruited to the University of South Florida as the Pamela and Leslie Muma Professor, Head of Neonatology, and Assistant Dean for Medical Education. He administered the academic and the clinical programs at the neonatal intensive care unit at Tampa General Hospital. In his laboratory, he investigated the role of intestinal macrophages and platelets in intestinal inflammation.

In 2018, he relocated to the Johns Hopkins University School of Medicine, Baltimore, Maryland as the Josephine S. Sutland Professor of Newborn Medicine, Head of Neonatology, and Vice-Chairman of the Department of Pediatrics. 

After having led neonatology programs at several institutions over a decade, Maheshwari relinquished these administrative positions to pursue his academic goals and to found the Global Newborn Society, a global organization that works for babies. He has established the official scientific journal of this society, the newborn and is serving as its current Editor-in-Chief. In recognition of his academic and public health efforts, he was honored to be a Fellow of the Royal College of Physicians, Edinburgh in 2022.

Academic pursuits 
In his scientific work, Maheshwari is an expert in the mechanisms of inflammation in newborn infants, particularly in their intestinal tract. In addition to more than 200 invited lectures, he has authored over 150 peer-reviewed articles, 6 medical textbooks with one more in press, and has contributed more than 55 chapters in various leading textbooks of neonatology. His research work has covered the following topics:

Effects of inflammatory proteins on the developing intestine 
Maheshwari noted that proteins such as interleukin-8, which are perceived in adults as harmful inflammatory mediators, are expressed in high concentrations in the amniotic fluid and in human milk, and are, therefore, ingested in large amounts by the developing fetus and the newborn infants. These proteins are expressed in multiple isoforms, and actually promote maturation of the developing intestine.

Inflammatory changes in the intestine of newborn infants 
Maheshwari has investigated the mechanisms involved in the recruitment of white blood cells into the inflamed intestine during NEC. He has also evaluated the importance of decreased blood monocyte and platelet counts for early diagnosis of NEC in these patients. Some of his studies have focused on intracellular molecular mechanisms of NEC, and helped identify some genetic markers or changes in gene expression as risk/diagnostic markers of NEC. His work has helped in our understanding of how a newborn infant develops tolerance to the millions of bacteria that populate our intestines after birth.

Inflammatory hyper-reactivity of white blood cells such as macrophages in the newborn intestine 
Maheshwari has shown that immature macrophages in a newborn infant’s intestinal wall get overly activated upon exposure to bacteria because the intestines of newborn infants are deficient in a suppressant protein called transforming growth factor-beta (TGF-β), especially the isoform, TGF-β2. This hyper-reactivity of the white blood cells can explain the intense inflammation seen in NEC. His team has identified many ways to increase the expression and activity of TGF-β in the newborn intestine and human milk.

Intestinal inflammation in severely anemic infants after RBC transfusions 
Premature and critically ill babies often develop severe anemia. In anemic infants, insufficient tissue oxygenation can disrupt the intestinal barrier and the bacteria normally present in the gut lumen can then invade the intestinal wall and the bloodstream. The intestine of a newborn infant does contain macrophages to defend against these bacteria, but these cells are functionally immature and can get overly activated if blood transfusions are given to correct this anemia. Maheshwari and his coworkers have confirmed these findings in human infants and laboratory models. They are currently investigating several possible candidate drugs to prevent/treat this disease.

Role of platelets in intestinal inflammation 
Most premature infants with NEC-related intestinal inflammation have decreased blood platelet counts, which increases the risk of bleeding both locally and in vital organs such as the brain. Decreased platelet counts are dangerous, but platelet transfusions are also not safe. Transfused platelets can augment inflammation both in the NEC-affected bowel and in other organ systems. Maheshwari and his team has investigated the involved mechanisms and identified potential treatment approaches.

Scientific research organizations 
Maheshwari has led several committees to review scientific proposals at the National Institutes of Health and at the American Heart Association. He also serves on the College of Reviewers at the Canadian Institutes of Health Research and similar committees in the United Kingdom, Belgium, The Netherlands, and Hong Kong, China. He serves on the editorial board of multiple medical journals, and is now serving as the Editor-in-Chief of the newly-launched free-of-cost journal from the Global Newborn Society (described above).

Pediatric health care organizations 
Maheshwari has been closely associated with several major health care organizations.

Global Newborn Society 
Maheshwari is the Founding Chair of a worldwide organization, the Global Newborn Society (GNS), which is focused on efforts to improve the health of newborn infants all over the world. He established this organization with help from Professor Dr. Minesh Khashu from the United Kingdom and with clinical, research, and social experts from all over the world. The GNS has four main objectives: (a) education and development of clinical protocols/guidelines; (b) collection of accurate epidemiological information, to help prioritize the organization's efforts; (c) find new medical solutions by energizing basic, translational, and clinical research, aiming for innovation in clinical practice; and (d) philanthropy, seeking social engagement to reduce neonatal disease and deaths. Further information and the rationale for many of these goals can be seen in the linked Wikipedia pages listed below.  

The GNS works to raise awareness that even today, millions of infants are lost due to reasons that could be minimized by appropriately-directed medical and logistical measures. The aim is to bring together health care professionals, families, citizens who had to endure critical illness during infancy, charitable organizations, government agencies, policy-makers, and everyone else who wishes to support these changes. Many experts are working to standardize quality-improvement measures in all aspects of neonatal care. Others seek to establish large data sets with multi-modality longitudinal follow-up, to generate insights beyond those possible from conventional paradigms. 

As described above, the GNS has started a new peer-reviewed, quarterly scientific journal, the newborn, with an editorial board comprised of experts from all over the world. Several issues of the journal have already been published. Maheshwari is serving as the Editor-in-Chief, and is working with this team to lower the cost of this journal, books, and scientific instruments relevant for newborn care.

American Pediatric Society and Society for Pediatric Research 
Maheshwari is an active member of the American Pediatric Society (APS), which seeks to promote child and adolescent health by promoting pediatric advocacy, scholarship, education, and leadership development. The APS partners with the Society for Pediatric Research, a voluntary association of multidisciplinary scientists. Since 2017, Maheshwari has been organizing a 'NEC Focus Group' plenary event at the Pediatric Academic Societies (PAS) Meetings  to review the latest advances in our understanding of this disease.

See also
 Newborn infants
 Neonatology
 Child mortality

References 

Neonatologists
Year of birth missing (living people)
Living people
Clinical research
Banaras Hindu University alumni
Postgraduate Institute of Medical Education and Research alumni
University of Florida alumni
University of South Florida alumni
21st-century physicians